Emperor Wen, Wendi, or the Wen Emperor may refer to:

 King Wen of Zhou (1112 BC–1050 BC),
 Emperor Wen of Han (202 BC–157 BC),
 Emperor Wen of Wei (187–226), see Cao Pi
 Emperor Wen of Jin (211–264), see Sima Zhao
 Emperor Wen of Eastern Wu (223–253), see Sun He
 Emperor Wen of Liu Song (407–453)
 Emperor Wen of Western Wei (507–551)
 Emperor Wen of Northern Zhou (507–556), see Yuwen Tai
 Emperor Wen of Chen (522–566)
 Emperor Wen of Sui (541–604)

See also 
 Duke Hui (disambiguation)